{{Infobox beauty pageant|photo=|broadcaster=Channel 3 (Thailand)|withdraws=|returns=|next=2013|before=2011|photogenic=Kevin Roxas Balot|congeniality=Noa Herrera|best national costume=Yuki Tachibana 2|venue=Pattaya, Thailand|caption=|placements=10|entrants=25|acts=Sirapassorn AtthayakornMiss International Queen 2011|presenters=Puwanart KunpalinSaraichatt Jirapaet|date=2 November 2012|winner=Kevin Roxas Balot|debuts=}}Miss International Queen 2012''', the eighth Miss International Queen pageant, was held on November 2, 2012, at Pattaya City in Thailand. Sirapassorn Atthayakorn of Thailand crowned her successor, Kevin Balot of the Philippines at the end of the event.

Results

Special Awards

Best Kiss Talent

Contestants

References

External links 
 
 https://www.amazon.com/Going-the-Distance/dp/B00UO6D9IA Ladyboys Season 2 Episode 3 covers this year, especially Kevin Balot, Nikki Mascenon, and Stefania Cruz.

2012 beauty pageants
2012
Beauty pageants in Thailand